Shaft (also known as Bāzār Shaft) is a city and capital of Shaft County, Gilan Province, Iran.  At the 2006 census, its population was 6,158, in 1,700 families.

Location
Nearby major villages are Ahmadsargoorab, Kalasham, Chobar, and Kozan. Some of the nearby villages like Imamzadeh Ebrahim have mountainous landscape which attract people from other cities on holidays. Rudkhan Castle is a tourist attraction in the vicinity of Shaft.

Economy
Rural economic activities include rice cultivation, fish farming, and animal husbandry.
 
On Mondays, Doshanbeh Bazaar, a local trade market is held there. That is why many know the place as Doshanbeh (Monday).

References

Populated places in Shaft County

Cities in Gilan Province